Marika Johanna Lehtimäki (born 7 February 1975) is a Finnish retired ice hockey player and former member of the Finnish national ice hockey team. She played 83 international matches with the national team and was on the bronze medal winning rosters in the women's tournament at the 1998 Winter Olympics in Nagano and at the IIHF Women's World Championships in 1990, 1992, and 1994. With the Finnish national team she also won four IIHF European Championship medals, three gold and one bronze.

In Finland, she played the majority of her senior club career with the Tampereen Ilves in the Naisten SM-sarja and won four consecutive Finnish Championships with the team from 1990 to 1993. Lehtimäki led the league in assists in the 1994–95 season, notching 28 assists in 24 games, while playing on Ilves' top line with Marianne Ihalainen and Sari Marjamäki.

Career statistics

International

Sources:

References

External links
 
 

1975 births
Living people
Finnish women's ice hockey forwards
Ice hockey players at the 1998 Winter Olympics
Ice hockey people from Tampere
Ilves Naiset players
Medalists at the 1998 Winter Olympics
Olympic bronze medalists for Finland
Olympic ice hockey players of Finland
Olympic medalists in ice hockey